Nasr Bin Hajjaaj Bin Alaat As Sulmani was a companion of the Islamic prophet Muhammad, born in Medina around 610 AD. He was so handsome that everyone was mesmerized by his beauty.

Early life
Nasr's father passed away when he was an adolescent, forcing him to take on the role of provider for his mother and younger siblings.

Exile From Medina
One night while Caliph Omar was patrolling the streets of Medina, he heard a married woman speaking about Nasr bin Hajjaj's beauty.

Amir Hazrat Umar Farooq ordered Nasr to his court. When he came to the Caliph's court, Hazrat Umar Farooq became convinced that this was the young man the married woman had spoken about. Umar ordered him shave his head to save the woman from the temptation of his beauty. Nasr followed the orders, but other people still saw him as beautiful. Umar issued another order for him to wear a turban, which, again, had no effect. The amir then ordered Nasr to leave the city and go to Basra, to prevent him tempting any women in the city.

References

Companions of the Prophet
610 births
670 deaths
Year of birth uncertain